Pezières or Pézières may refer to:

People
Georges Pézières (1885–1941), French politician

Places
Les Pézières, hamlet of the municipality of Aranc in the Ain department, France
Pezières, Épehy, former hamlet and municipality, currently a part of the municipality of Épehy in the Somme department, France